Richland Township is one of seventeen townships in Adair County, Iowa, USA.  At the 2010 census, its population was 174.

History
Richland Township was organized in 1860.
A school house had been built beforehand in 1858.
Richland Cemetery was built in 1869, followed by the township's post office (named Fisk) in 1870, and Union Church cemetery in 1871.

Geography
According to the USGS, it contains three cemeteries: Penn Avenue, Pleasant Grove and Union.

References

External links
 US-Counties.com
 City-Data.com

Townships in Adair County, Iowa
Townships in Iowa
1860 establishments in Iowa